R. Perumal is an Indian politician and  was a member of the 14th Tamil Nadu Legislative Assembly from the Sriperumbudur constituency. He represented the All India Anna Dravida Munnetra Kazhagam party.

The elections of 2016 resulted in his constituency being won by K. Palani.

References 

Tamil Nadu MLAs 2011–2016
All India Anna Dravida Munnetra Kazhagam politicians
Living people
Year of birth missing (living people)